Badiyadka   officially known as "Badiadka" (also known as Perdala") is a town and gram panchayat in the Kasaragod district, state of Kerala, India.

Badiyadka is a panchayath in Kasaragod Taluk in Kasaragod District of Kerala, India. It is located 13 km to the east of District headquarters Kasaragod. 17 km from Manjeshwara. 584 km from State capital Thiruvananthapuram.

Badiyadka Pin code is 671551 and postal office is Perdala.

Enmakaje (8 km), Madhur (9 km), Puthige (9 km), Delampady (9 km), Karadka (9 km) are the nearby villages to Badiyadka. Kasaragod, Puttur, Kanhangad, Mangalore are the nearby cities to Badiyadka. The nearest airport is Mangalore International Airport, Bajpe.	

This place is in the border of the Kasaragod District and Dakshina Kannada District. It is near to the Karnataka-Kerala State border.

The State Highway 31 (Kerala) to Karnataka passes through the town. Badiyadka is the cross roads of Kumbla, Uppala, Kasaragod, Mulleria-Mercara and Puttur. Bolukatte is an active sport and cricket grounds in Badiyadka.

Madhur Sri Madanantheshwara Vinayaka Temple, Perdala Mosque, St. Mary's Church and Perdala Udaneshwara Temple are the important religious places around the town and the Perdla Uroos festival is held once in every two year is famous in this area.

Economy
Arecanut is the chief agricultural product from this place. Other crops, are: Coconut, Rubber, Cashew and Cocoa. Beedi making (various brands) is the occupation of many families here. The Koraga tribal community living in Badiyadka has its own colony.

Rail
Kasaragod Station is nearest major railway station (21 km) to Badiyadka. Also Kumbla Station 17 km near to Badiyadka.

Sports
Cricket and football are given major importance. Other major sports include volleyball, Kabaddi and badminton.

Climate
Badiyadka has a tropical climate. In most months of the year, there is significant rainfall in Badiyadka. There is only a short dry season and it is not very effective. The Köppen-Geiger climate classification is Am. The average annual temperature in Badiyadka is 27.1 °C. About 3801 mm of precipitation falls annually.

The driest month is January with 1 mm. Most precipitation falls in July, with an average of 1178 mm.

The warmest month of the year is April with an average temperature of 29.2 °C. In July, the average temperature is 25.9 °C. It is the lowest average temperature of the whole year.

State Government Offices
 Badiyadka, Sub Registrar Office.
 Local Self Government - Badiyadka Panchayath.
 Office of the Assistant Educational Office, Kumbla at Badiyadka
 Post Office: Perdala Post Office
KSEB / Asst. Engineer Office
PWD Engineer Office

Schools

 GHSS Badiyadka.(Senior Secondary School)
 Navajeevana High School (NHS), Perdala. (Senior Secondary School)
 Chinmaya Vidyalaya, Badiyadka
 Shri Bharathi Vidyapyapeeta, Badiyadka (High School)
 Holy Family Convent Public School
Kanniyath Usthad Islamic Academy
Kunil school
Little Rose
Nursery School Chedekal

Demographics
As of 2011 Census, Badiyadka village had a population of 10,694 of which constitutes 5,320 males and 5,374 females. Average sex ratio of Badiyadka was 1,010 lower than state average of 1,084. The population of children under 6 years was 1,191 which makes up 11.1% of total population. Child sex ratio for Badiyadka as per census is 946, lower than state average of 964.
Badiyadka village had lower literacy rate compared to Kerala. In 2011, literacy rate of Badiyadka village was 88.3% compared to 94.00% of Kerala. The male literacy stands at 92.9% while female literacy rate was 82.8%.

Badiyadka Grama Panchayat had total population of 34,207 where 16,988 are males and 17,219 are females. There are 6,744 families residing in badiyadka panchayat limits. Badiyadka panchayat consists of 3 revenue villages like Badiyadka, Neerchal and Bela. 
Average literacy of Badiyadka panchayat is 88.36% where male literacy stands at 92.85% and female literacy at 83.93%.

Transportation
It is well connected to district HQ Kasaragod, Mulleria, Perla, and other towns in Kerala and Puttur, Mangalore, Sullia towns in Karnataka state. Direct bus service is available to Bangalore via Puttur

Administration

 District: Kasargod
 Taluk/Tehsil: Kasaragod
 Block: Kasaragod
 Assembly Constituency: Kasaragod
 Parliament Constituency: Kasargod
 Police Station:  Badiyadka
 Post Office:   671551
 Telephone Exchange:  Perdala. 04998
 Nearest Railway Station: Kasaragod

Image gallery

See also
Bekal
Kasaragod District
Perla
Uppala

References

Suburbs of Kasaragod